The 32nd Philips Rally Argentina was the fifth round of 2012 FIA World Rally Championship. It is the longest rally of the year, covering total of 502.73 stage kilometres, with Ambul also being the longest stage of the year. The event took place between 26 and 29 April 2012.

Report
Ford World Rally Team driver Jari-Matti Latvala was forced out of the rally after his accident while training two weeks before the rally. He was replaced by Dani Sordo.

Results

Event standings

Special stages

Power Stage
The "Power stage" was a  stage at the end of the rally.

Championship standings after the event

Drivers' championship
Points are awarded to the top 10 classified finishers.

Notes:
1 2 3 refers to the classification of the drivers on the 'Power Stage', where bonus points are awarded 3–2–1 for the fastest three drivers on the stage.

Manufacturers' championship

Notes:
† — The Mini WRC Team lost its manufacturer status in February when parent company BMW withdrew works support from the team, demoting them to customer team status. The team kept the points it scored on Rallye Monte Carlo although it was no longer classified as a manufacturer entrant. They were replaced by the WRC Team Mini Portugal as the official Mini works team.
‡ — Armindo Araújo World Rally Team and Palmeirinha Rally merged to form WRC Team Mini Portugal. The points they scored at the Rallye Monte Carlo were removed from the manufacturers' championship.

PWRC Drivers' championship

References

Argentina
Rally Argentina
Rally